Yan Yurevich Tsapnik (born 15 August 1968) is a Soviet and Russian theatre and film actor. Yan appeared in more than 200 films.

Biography

Early life
Yan Tsapnik was born in Irkutsk, Russian SFSR, Soviet Union (now Russia).

Selected filmography

References

External links 
 Yan Tsapnik on kino-teatr.ru

1968 births
Living people
Actors  from Irkutsk
Soviet male film actors
Soviet male stage actors
Russian male film actors
Russian male television actors
Russian male stage actors
21st-century Russian male actors
Russian State Institute of Performing Arts alumni
Russian television presenters
Personnel of the Soviet Airborne Forces